Pam Hart is a former international lawn bowls competitor for Australia.

Bowls career
She won a silver medal in the pairs with Jean Turnbull and bronze medal in the fours with Turnbull, Connie Hicks and Mary Ormsby at the 1969 World Outdoor Bowls Championship in Sydney. She also won a silver medal in the team event (Taylor Trophy) in 1969.

References

Australian female bowls players
20th-century Australian women